Conus cardinalis, common name the cardinal cone, is a species of sea snail, a marine gastropod mollusk in the family Conidae, the cone snails and their allies.

Like all species within the genus Conus, these snails are predatory and venomous. They are capable of "stinging" humans, therefore live ones should be handled carefully or not at all.

Distribution
This species occurs in the Caribbean Sea (Guadeloupe) and in the Gulf of Mexico.

Description 
The maximum recorded shell length is 32.2 mm.

Habitat 
Minimum recorded depth is 0 m. Maximum recorded depth is 21 m.

References

 Puillandre N., Duda T.F., Meyer C., Olivera B.M. & Bouchet P. (2015). One, four or 100 genera? A new classification of the cone snails. Journal of Molluscan Studies. 81: 1–23
 Bernardi, A. B., 1861. Description de deux espèces nouvelles du genre Cône. Journal de Conchyliologie 9: 169–171
 Fischer-Piette, E., 1950. Listes des types décrits dans le Journal de Conchyliologie et conservés dans la collection de ce journal. Journal de Conchyliologie 90: 8–23

External links
 The Conus Biodiversity website
 Cone Shells – Knights of the Sea
 
 Lectotype at MNHN, Paris

cardinalis
Gastropods described in 1792